This is a list of countries by the United Nations geoscheme, including 193 UN member states, 2 UN observer states (the Holy See and Palestine), 2 states in free association with New Zealand (the Cook Islands and Niue), and 50 non-sovereign dependencies/territories, as well as Western Sahara (a territory whose sovereignty is disputed) and Antarctica.

In total, 249 countries and territories have been listed. Not included in the list are de facto states (whose sovereignty are not recognised by the UN), the Sovereign Base Areas of Akrotiri and Dhekelia, and 4 uninhabited territories (the Ashmore and Cartier Islands, Clipperton Island, the Coral Sea Islands, and Navassa Island).

The United Nations Statistics Division created and maintains the M49 – Standard country or area codes for statistical use. The codes are listed from smallest to largest region, left to right.

Table

See also

Lists of countries and territories
List of countries and inhabited areas
Country
List of associated states
List of de facto states
List of sovereign states
Territory
List of dependent territories
List of disputed territories
List of overseas territories
United Nations list of non-self-governing territories
Timeline of geopolitical changes (1900−1999)
Timeline of geopolitical changes (2000−present)
United Nations geoscheme
United Nations Statistics Division
UN M49

References

External links
Standard country or area codes for statistical use (M49)

United Nations geoscheme
United Nations geoscheme
Countries by United Nations geoscheme